This is a list of radio stations that broadcast on FM frequency 102.8 MHz:

India
Vividh Bharati in Hyderabad

Indonesia
 Radio Jatayu Angkasa (JFM) in Semarang
 Radio Al Khairat (RAL FM) in Manado

Malaysia
 Era in Kuala Terengganu, Terengganu

United Kingdom
 Hot Radio in Dorset
 Capital Midlands in Derbyshire
 Sun FM in County Durham
 Heart South in Kent
 Moray Firth Radio in Moray
 Pirate FM 102 in Cornwall
 Canalside in Cheshire
 Tay FM in Dundee
 Free Herefordshire & Worcestershire in Worcestershire
 Capital Manchester in Lancashire

References

Lists of radio stations by frequency